James Longman (born 28 December 1986) is an English journalist and foreign correspondent for US network ABC News. Previously, he worked at the BBC where he worked as a general news reporter and the corporation's Beirut correspondent. Fluent in Arabic and French, he specialised in the Middle East, and regularly reports on issues around the refugee crisis and the Arab world, as well as terrorist incidents around Europe.

Early life
Longman was born in 1986 in West London. He was educated at Hill House in Knightsbridge and at Worth School, a boarding school in West Sussex. He has a bachelor's degree in Arabic from the School of Oriental and African Studies, and a masters in Comparative Politics from the London School of Economics.

Career
Longman started his career inside Syria, where he spent six months reporting for British newspapers, spending time in rebel-held areas in the lead-up to the war. In 2012, he was hired by the BBC for his speciality in Syria.

He has taken a particular interest in mental health, and reported on his own family's history for the BBC's Victoria Derbyshire programme, where he was based in London.

In 2016, he ran the London Marathon in aid of Mind.

Now at ABC, he has travelled to over 50 countries on breaking news, as well as on features and news specials on all kinds of issues for ABC's Good Morning America, World News Tonight and Nightline, as well as for National Geographic's Virus Hunters. Longman won the David Bloom award from the Radio and Television Correspondents Association and a Deadline Club award from the Society of Professional Journalists for his work in Chechnya, and won a News Emmy in 2021 for his work on the climate crisis in India, having also been nominated for his work in Thailand, Sri Lanka, Antarctica and the Middle East. He was nominated for Young Talent of the Year at the 2016 Royal Television Society Awards.

Personal life
Longman is gay. He became engaged to his boyfriend in the summer of 2020, and they married in July 2022.

References

1986 births
Alumni of SOAS University of London
Journalists from London
Gay journalists
English gay men
English LGBT journalists
Living people
People educated at Worth School